The Austrian Landesliga is the fourth tier of professional football in Austria. It is divided into nine conferences — one for each Austrian state:

Burgenland: Landesliga Burgenland
Lower Austria: 1. Niederösterreichische Landesliga
Vienna: Wiener Stadtliga
The champions of each conference are promoted to the Regional League East.
Carinthia and East Tyrol: Kärntner Liga
Upper Austria: OÖ Liga
Styria: Landesliga Steiermark
The champions of each conference are promoted to the Regional League Central.
Salzburg: Salzburger Liga
Tyrol (without East Tyrol): Tiroler Liga
Vorarlberg: Vorarlbergliga
The champions of each conference are promoted to the Regional League West.

External links
Landesliga Lower Austria 
Landesliga Vienna 
The Austrian Landesliga on soccerway.com
The Austrian Landesligas on Weltfussball.de 

 
4
Fourth level football leagues in Europe